Mangelia colombi is a species of sea snail, a marine gastropod mollusk in the family Mangeliidae.

Description
The length of the shell attains 8.8 mm.

The white, elongate fusiform shell contains 7 whorls of which 2½ in the protoconch. These are intermediary convex with linear sutures, discreetly undulant. The shell shows many longitudinal striae and oblique ribs. It shows many ribs, 15-16 in the penultimate whorl and 13-14 on the body whorl. The rather narrow aperture is almost quadrangular. The outer lip is flexuously arcuate and incrassate on the outside and the inside. The round sinus lies deep under the suture. The siphonal canal is very short and wide.

Distribution
This marine species occurs off Lifou, New Caledonia.

References

 Fischer-Piette, E., 1950. Liste des types décrits dans le Journal de Conchyliologie et conservés dans la collection de ce journal (avec planches)(suite). Journal de Conchyliologie 90: 149-180

External links
  Tucker, J.K. 2004 Catalog of recent and fossil turrids (Mollusca: Gastropoda). Zootaxa 682:1-1295.
 MNHN: Mangilia colombi

colombi
Gastropods described in 1897